Allmänna Svenska Elektriska Aktiebolaget (English translation: General Swedish Electrical Limited Company; Swedish abbreviation: ASEA) was a Swedish industrial company.

History

ASEA was founded in 1883 by Ludvig Fredholm in Västerås as a manufacturer of electrical light and generators. After merging with Wenström's & Granström's Electrical Power Company (Wenströms & Granströms Elektriska Kraftbolag) the name was changed to Allmänna Svenska Elektriska Aktiebolaget, literally the "General Swedish Electrical Limited Company", or ASEA for short.

In 1987, it announced a merger with the Swiss company Brown, Boveri & Cie (BBC) to form ABB Group. ABB Group began operations in 1988. After this merger, ABB Group acquired several companies, including the power transmission and distribution operations of the Westinghouse Electric Corporation and the Combustion Engineering Group.

1889 - the partner Jonas Wenström creates 3-phased generators, motors and transformers.
1933 - The company removes the swastika from its logo, due to the symbol's association with Nazi Germany.
1953 - ASEA creates the first industrial diamonds.
1954 - HVDC Gotland project, first static high-voltage DC system
1960s - ASEA builds nine of 12 nuclear plants in Sweden.
1968 - ASEA’s elevator business gets acquired by Kone
1974 - Industrial robots are introduced by ASEA
1987 - Acquires Finnish Oy Strömberg Ab
1988 - Merges with BBC Brown Boveri, Asea Cylinda laundry appliances branch bought by Finnish furniture maker Asko, renamed Asko ASEA.

Business management

CEOs
1883–1891 – Ludvig Fredholm
1891–1903 – Göran Wenström
1903–1933 – Sigfrid Edström
1934–1942 – Arthur Lindén
1942–1949 – Thorsten Ericson
1949–1961 – Åke Vrethem
1961–1976 – Curt Nicolin
1976–1980 – Torsten L. Lindström
1980–1988 – Percy Barnevik

Chairman of the Board
1891–1891 – Ludvig Fredholm
1892–1909 – Oscar Fredrik Wijkman
1910–1914 – Oscar Wallenberg
1914–1933 – Sten Ankarcrona
1934–1949 – Sigfrid Edström
1949–1956 – Thorsten Ericson
1956–1976 – Marcus Wallenberg
1976–1991 – Curt Nicolin

See also
 ASEA IRB - robot
 Sigfrid Edström
 Uno Lamm
 Asko

References

Further reading
 Jan Glete, Asea under hundra år: 1883-1983: en studie i ett storföretags organisatoriska, tekniska och ekonomiska utveckling. (Västerås, 1987). 

Defunct companies of Sweden
Locomotive manufacturers of Sweden
 
Companies based in Stockholm
Manufacturing companies established in 1883
1883 establishments in Sweden
Manufacturing companies disestablished in 1988
Manufacturing companies of Sweden
1988 disestablishments in Sweden
1988 mergers and acquisitions